Destiny of a Spy is a 1969 American TV movie directed by Boris Sagal. It premiered on NBC on October 27, 1969 but was released theatrically in some territories outside the USA.

It was the first time in eleven years Lorne Greene had played a role other than Ben Cartwright in Bonanza. It was shot in Britain.

The same producer, director and writer reteamed to make The Movie Murderer (1970).

Cast
Lorne Greene
Rachel Roberts
Anthony Quayle

References

External links
Destiny of a Spy at IMDb

1969 television films
1969 films
American television films
Films directed by Boris Sagal